Apostolos Skondras (born 29 December 1988) is a Greek professional footballer who plays as a centre back for Super League 2 club Anagennisi Karditsa.

Career 
He started his career from the youth academies of Atromitos and is the older brother of Ioannis Skondras, who plays for PAOK. He has played in clubs of lower leagues such as Panargiakos, Diagoras and Thrasyvoulos where he had successful seasons. On 20 July 2012, he signed a 1-year contract with AEL.

On 29 July 2013 he signed contract with PAS Giannina.
His brother is the Greek footballer Giannis Skondras.

Honours 
PAS Giannina

 Super League Greece 2: 2019–20

Veria
 Football League: 2020–21

References

1988 births
Living people
Footballers from Athens
Greek footballers
Association football midfielders
Super League Greece players
Gamma Ethniki players
Football League (Greece) players
Super League Greece 2 players
Atromitos F.C. players
Panargiakos F.C. players
Diagoras F.C. players
Thrasyvoulos F.C. players
Athlitiki Enosi Larissa F.C. players
Panegialios F.C. players
PAS Giannina F.C. players
Veria NFC players
Anagennisi Karditsa F.C. players